Dublin Port is  the seaport of Dublin, Ireland, of both historical and contemporary economic importance. Approximatively two-thirds of Ireland's port traffic travels via the port, which is by far the busiest on the island of Ireland.

Location
The modern Dublin Port is located either side of the River Liffey, out to its mouth. On the north side of the river, the main part of the port lies at the end of East Wall and North Wall, from Alexandra Quay. The element of the port on the south side of the river is much smaller and lies at the beginning of the Poolbeg peninsula.

Access
The port is served by road, with a direct connection from the Dublin Port Tunnel to the northern part (and so a connection with the M50 motorway).  

There is no passenger rail service to either part of Dublin Port but the northern part is served by freight rail.  The northern part is also served by Dublin Bus, with route 53 and by a Luas terminus just outside the port area.  The southern part can be reached by bus, and both are also served by taxi.

Dublin Port Company

The port is operated by the semi-state Dublin Port Company (DPC), incorporated on 28 February 1997 (formerly the Dublin Port and Docks Board, and successor to the Ballast Board founded in 1707), the headquarters of which are located just beyond the main port entrance on the northern side of the Liffey. In 2017 the area around the headquarters was rebuilt with the installation of a heritage crane and creation of a maritime-themed garden. The company is responsible for infrastructure of the port, with individual operations run by tenants such as State authorities, notably the customs service, ferry, freight and oil companies, terminal operators, and stevedores.

The port company is responsible for pilotage services within Dublin Bay, and manages the three port lighthouses (but not those of Howth or Kish Bank). It also formerly operated two drydocks, which were closed in 2016.

According to DPC, the port handled 23.5 million tonnes of cargo in 2003, as well as 1,426,000 passengers. That year 7,917 ships docked in the port, including 54 cruise liners carrying 54,000 visitors. In April 2010, the company announced its "busiest week ever", following restrictions placed on European airspace because of the eruption of the Eyjafjallajökull volcano in Iceland. Some 72,118 passengers were reported to have travelled through the ferry terminals during the week of 15–21 April that year, and that week saw the culmination of increased trade in Dublin Port, as the company's figures for the first quarter of 2010 would eventually reveal. March 2010 saw a 13.5% trade increase when compared with March 2009, and that month was declared by the company as the fourth consecutive month of trade increase since the economic downturn. The figures of imports and exports declined during the depression of 2010 but then increased during the decade and in 2019, 38.1 million tonnes of cargo was handled and there were 7,898 ship movements of which 158 were cruise ships.

History
The medieval port of Dublin was located on the south bank of the Liffey near Christ Church Cathedral, a few kilometres upstream from its current location. 

On 17 September 1707, Thomas Burgh the Surveyor General of Ireland read a paper to the Dublin Society entitled 'Some Thoughts for the Improveing the Harbour of Dublin' (sic) in which the dangers of the bar of Dublin (a shallow sandbank which ran across the mouth of the river) was mentioned as well as a proposed basin in which ships could be secure from inclement weather or hostile attack.

The year 1707 also witnessed the passing of "An Act for Cleansing the Port, Harbour, and River of Dublin and for Erecting a Ballast Office in the said city" which witnessed the initiation of the Ballast Office - the first municipal authority in Dublin to take control of the port. The key functions of the Ballast Office were the imposition of port charges and the maintenance of the navigation channel, the latter of which had been a perennial problem.

In 1715, work began on constructing the Great South Wall to shelter the entrance to the port. Poolbeg Lighthouse at the end of the South Bull Wall was constructed in 1767. The wall was finally completed in 1795 measuring 5 km. This protected the port from the shifting sands of Dublin Bay.

After James Gandon's Custom House was built further downstream in 1791, the port moved downstream to the north bank of the river estuary.

In 1800, a three month survey of Dublin Bay conducted by Captain William Bligh recommended the construction of the Bull Wall. After the completion of the wall in 1825, North Bull Island slowly formed as sand built up behind it.

The advent of containerisation in the second half of the 20th century resulted in the port gradually moving a mile further downstream to enable new wharves with deeper water to be constructed.

Future
A Masterplan 2040 was published by the Dublin Port Company in 2012 setting out a plan to improve capacity at the Port and a commitment not to expand the Port into Dublin Bay. Prior to the Masterplan, over 40 years, the Dublin Port authorities had been exploring a controversial proposal to in-fill 21 hectares (52 acres) of Dublin Bay. The proposed development of Dublin Port which would have increased its capacity by 50 per cent was rejected by Bord Pleanála in June 2010.

Services
The main activity of the port is freight handling, with a wide range of vessels, from large container carriers to small diesel lighters, visiting daily.

Roll-on/roll-off passenger ferry services run regularly across the Irish Sea to Holyhead in Wales, Liverpool in England and in the summer months and at Christmas to Douglas, Isle of Man. Services also go to Cherbourg, France. The largest car ferry in the world, the Irish Ferries ship MV Ulysses which can carry up to 2000 passengers, runs on the Holyhead route. A new ship MV W.B. Yeats entered service in 2018 and is on the Cherbourg route.  Another company, CLDN, has ships that travel 6 times a week to Rotterdam and Zeebrugge and use the latest super ferries in Europe: MV Celine and MV Delphine. These are world’s largest short-sea Ro-Ro vessels with 8 km of road space on board. They do not take trucks on board, just the trailers.

Dublin Port is also increasingly a docking point for cruise liners. Celebrity Eclipse began to home port in Dublin on 29 April 2018, and the port authorities reported 158 cruise ship visits in 2019. A temporary facility, Terminal 7, was created between Promenade and Tolka Quay Road at Branch Road; entered from Promenade Road, this allows cruise guests to check-in and leave baggage. A shuttle service transports guests to Ocean Pier 33. A new baggage claim facility was added to Ocean Pier 33 for guests to use when disembarking.

Aids to navigation and pilotage
The port has three lighthouses in the mouth of the Liffey, multiple other aids to navigation and operates a pilot service.

Terminals and operators
There are eleven passenger, freight and border inspection terminals at Dublin Port, serving several operators.

Passenger ferry operators

Passenger ferries

Freight operators

Other activities

Within the main port enclave, on the north side of the river, are a power generating station (gas-fired), several oil terminals and number of slightly-related businesses, and a Circle K petrol station on Bond Road. Entered at the north side of the port, but lying in East Wall, is one end of the Dublin Port Tunnel.

Since 2015 DPC has been involved in a series of heritage and community projects, including the Diving Bell Museum, the Tolka Greenway, the Maritime Garden, and the Pumphouse Heritage Zone. In 2020, the Liffey to Tolka Greenway, designed with Grafton Architects, was announced with support from the port company.

Incidents
A number of workers have died whilst working at Dublin port, including James Byrne (June 2018), Dennis Gomez (November 2018) and Matthew Grimes (May 2021).

See also

Dublin Port Tunnel

References

External links

 UKHO charts of Dublin Docks and the approaches to Dublin
 Dublin Port Company website
 RTÉ Radio 1 programme about South Bull Wall https://web.archive.org/web/20070322094650/http://www.rte.ie/radio1/shanksmare/rams/2006/1september.smil

Transport in County Dublin
Dublin Bay
Ports and harbours of the Republic of Ireland
Ports and harbours of the Irish Sea
Street running
Dublin Docklands